Anthony D. "Tony" Saletan is an American folk singer, children's instructional television pioneer, and music educator, who is responsible for the modern rediscovery, in the mid-1950s, of two of the genre's best-known songs, "Michael Row the Boat Ashore" and "Kumbaya". In 1955, he was the first performer to appear on Boston's new educational television station, WGBH. In 1969, Saletan was the first musical guest to appear on Sesame Street.

Early life 

Born and raised in New York City, he attended the Walden School and received his bachelor's and master's degrees from Harvard University. For a brief period during his childhood, Saletan's piano teacher was a young Leonard Bernstein. He was involved as a teen in the Henry Wallace presidential campaign of 1948, in which original music in the folk style was important. Saletan settled in the Boston area, where for several years he appeared on educational television (WGBH), taught music in the Newton, Massachusetts public schools, and gave private guitar lessons. He also became involved in folk dancing and calling of contra dances. Saletan has often taught at Pinewoods Dance Camp in Plymouth, Massachusetts. Later in life, Saletan moved to Tacoma, Washington.

Shaker Village Work Camp and the Folk Revival 

Saletan spent the summer of 1953 at Buck’s Rock Work Camp leading the campers in regular folk song  sessions.

In 1954, Tony Saletan was preparing to work as folksong leader at the Shaker Village Work Camp. He searched the Widener Library of Harvard University for material to teach the villagers that summer. Out of that research, he adapted the song  "Michael Row the Boat Ashore" from the 1867 songbook Slave Songs of the United States to create the version that is well-known today. "I judged that the tune was very singable, added some harmony (a guitar accompaniment) and thought the one-word chorus would be an easy hit with the teens (it was). But a typical original verse consisted of one line repeated once, and I thought a rhyme would be more interesting to the teenagers at Shaker Village Work Camp, where I introduced it. So I adapted traditional African-American couplets in place of the original verses." Saletan's adaptation was included in the Village's 1954 songbook, Songs of Work.

During the summer of 1954, Saletan taught "Michael Row the Boat Ashore" to Pete Seeger, who later sang it with the Weavers, one of the most important singing groups leading the American folk music revival of the 1950s to mid-1960s. Saletan shared a 1958 copyright in his adaptation with the members of the Weavers. A single based on Saletan's version was released in 1960 by the American folk quintet the Highwaymen under the abbreviated title, "Michael", and reached number one  on the U.S. and British hit parades in September 1961. Out of respect for the original, unknown authors of the song, Saletan kept his royalties from the Highwaymen's hit in escrow "seeking some good use for it."

Joe Hickerson, co-founder of the Folksmiths, credits Saletan for introducing him to the song "Kumbaya" in 1957 (Saletan had learned it from Lynn Rohrbough, co-proprietor with his wife Katherine of the camp songbook publisher Cooperative Recreation Service). The first LP recording of "Kumbaya" was released in 1958 by the Folksmiths. Folksinger Peggy Seeger was also taught several songs by Saletan, which she later recorded.

Television and recording career 

Saletan was the first person to appear on WGBH, Channel 2, when Boston's public educational television station made its on-air debut on May 2, 1955. He sang the theme song for Come and See, a program aimed at preschoolers. Following a 1959-1960 world tour sponsored by the U.S. State Department, Saletan released the album I'm a Stranger Here on Prestige Records (1962). On his return from abroad, he created Sing, Children, Sing for national distribution on educational television, based on an earlier WGBH project, Music Grade II. In the 1960s, Saletan also hosted several episodes of What's New, broadcast "field trips" to historic locations with associated songs.

In 1964, a year after their marriage, Saletan and Irene Kossoy (formerly and subsequently of the Kossoy Sisters) joined with Jackie Washington Landrón to form the Boston Folk Trio, which presented school concerts through the non-profit Young Audiences Arts for Learning. The couple also performed as Tony and Irene Saletan. In 1970, they released an album on Folk-Legacy Records, Tony and Irene Saletan: Folk Songs & Ballads. They also made a 7" vinyl recording of four songs for the Boston Mutual Life Insurance Company, titled The Ballad of Boston and Other New England Folk Tunes. Tony and Irene performed together at the Fox Hollow Folk Festival in 1971, as well as with Irene's sister, Ellen, and Ellen's then husband, Robin Christenson.

On December 16, 1969, Saletan made a guest appearance during the first season (episode 27) of Sesame Street, the iconic children's television program. In the first of four segments on which he appeared, Saletan led the show's children and adult regulars (including Big Bird and Oscar) in an adaptation of the traditional workers' alphabet song, "So Merry, So Merry Are We", as well as a traditional counting song, "Ten Little Angels". In the second, he sings and takes ideas from the children to invent new verses for "I Wish I Was a Mole in the Ground", and then plays "Cripple Creek" on banjo as Gordon demonstrates the limberjack. In the third segment, he sings Woody Guthrie's "Pick it Up" and then "Mi Chacra" ("my farm"), teaching animal names in Spanish. Saletan concludes the show with Guthrie's "Gonna Take Everybody (All Work Together)".

In the early 1970s, Tony Saletan hosted three public television series for children, produced by Western Instructional Television (Hollywood, California): The Song Bag, Let's All Sing with Tony Saletan, and Singing Down the Road. Two record albums were issued from these shows mostly drawn from American folksongs, including those discovered and developed for teaching young Shaker Villagers. The first album to emerge from the WIT shows, Song Bag with Tony Saletan, likewise had an associated teacher's guide and songbook. Saletan also recorded Songs and Sounds of the Sea (National Geographic Society 1973), Revolutionary Tea (with the Yankee Tunesmiths, Old North Bridge Records 1975), and George & Ruth (songs of the Spanish Civil War, Educational Alternatives 2004).

Discography 

 I'm a Stranger Here (1961)
 Folksongs & Ballads (with Irene Saletan) (1970) Many cuts available on YouTube
 Songs and Sounds of the Sea (1973)
 Song Bag with Tony Saletan (1974)
 Revolutionary Tea  (1975)
 Let's All Sing with Tony Saletan (1976)  Episode available for viewing on YouTube
 George & Ruth (2004)

See also 

 Shaker Village Work Group

Notes

References 
 
 
  — Includes "Michael Row the Boat Ashore." "Paul Campbell" was a pseudonym adopted from 1950 to 1953 for Ronnie Gilbert, Lee Hays, Fred Hellerman and Peter Seeger (source).
  — Includes short biographies of Saletan (pp. 204–05) and other folksingers, including reference in Pete Seeger bio to 1948 Wallace campaign (p. 211).
  — With an associated phonograph album or cassette tape.
  — Phonograph album.
 
– Pete Seeger attributes the rediscovery and modern adaptation of the song "Michael Row Your Boat Ashore" to Saletan. Seeger offered the same attribution (calling the song "Michael, Row The Boat Ashore") in his paperback songbook:
 
  — Book of musical scores, compiled by Tony Saletan. Includes the song Michael Row the Boat Ashore.
 
 Folksmiths. (1958). We've Got Some Singing To Do. New York: Folkways Records (F-2407). . — 33 rpm phonograph album. Track 12 is Kum Bah Yah. The liner notes credit Tony Saletan for teaching the Folksmiths several songs. Re-released on audio CD as: We've Got Some Singing to Do: The Folksmiths Travelling Folk Workshop. Washington, DC: Smithsonian Folkways (FW02407). .
 
  — A quote from Saletan on the origins of the song, including his work at the Shaker Village Work Camp. The text is from a personal email by Saletan to the author of the webpage, Richard Kopp.
 
  — Album was released 2003 on Appleseed Records. Notes refer to Tony Saletan and the Shaker Village Work Camp of 1954.
  — Saletan explains the Work Group's activities and shows a music and dance performance by the teenagers (more information). This video is included on the DVD "The Shakers On Television."

External links 
 WGBH Alumni
 Folksongs & Ballads

Living people
American male singer-songwriters
Singers from New York City
American folk singers
20th-century American singers
21st-century American singers
1931 births
Harvard University alumni
20th-century American male singers
21st-century American male singers
Walden School (New York City) alumni
Contra dance callers
Singer-songwriters from New York (state)